Marsden State High School (MSHS) is a secondary school in Waterford West, Queensland for students between years 7 and 12. Marsden State High School is located on the corner of Chambers Flat Road and Muchow Road between the suburbs of Marsden and Waterford West. The school was established in 1987 and, as of 2022, has 3,576 students. It is the largest high school by enrolments in Australia. From the school's opening, in 1987, until 2010, the motto was Success Through Industry, however, from 2010 until 2012 the motto has been Empowering Individuals, Expanding Horizons, Creating Futures. From 2013 the School Motto has been Dare to Inspire, Make A Difference. The school's colours, previously brown and cream, were changed to maroon and ash in 2009.

Programs 
The schools current sporting, academic and awareness programs are:

 #MTC - Mates Talk Change, a program encouraging good mental health provides a variety of positive mental strategies, including Top 5 Squad
 ELP - Exceptional Learners Program, a discipline for high achievers
 Soccer Excellence - a popular sporting excellence program
 Rugby League Excellence - a popular sporting excellence, see notable alumni.
 Basketball Excellence - a popular sporting excellence program
 Dance Excellence - a program in which exceptional dancers join
 Music Excellence - Exceptional students can choose to sing or play an instrument
 The Arts - The arts is a group of subjects in the creative fields such as Music, Dance, Film & Television and art.
 AVID - A class built on traditional American-style AVID principles.
M.A.D.- Make a difference program, bringing change to the community.

Notable alumni 
 Jaydn Su'A  – rugby league player with the South Sydney Rabbitohs. 
 Corey Allan – rugby league player with the Canterbury-Bankstown Bulldogs.
Tesi Niu  – rugby league player with the Brisbane Broncos.
 Cameron Smith – rugby league player with the Melbourne Storm.
 Israel Folau – rugby league player with the Catalans Dragons, former Australian rules and former Rugby Union player for the New South Wales Waratahs
 Hulita Haukinima, Queensland Firebirds netball player.
 Chris Sandow – rugby league player.
 Antonio Winterstein –  rugby league player.
 Joe Tomane –  former professional rugby league footballer, now rugby union player.
 Caleb Timu – former NRL player for Brisbane Broncos and played Rugby Union for the Queensland Reds also internationally for Australia national rugby union team  Wallabies. Played overseas for Montpellier Hérault Rugby and just recently retired June 28 2021.
 Patrick Mago –  former NRL player for Brisbane Broncos and South Sydney Rabbitohs. July 15 2021 Signed new contract with the Super League team Wigan for three years.
 Brenko Lee – current NRL player for Melbourne Storm. Former Teams Canberra Raiders, Canterbury-Bankstown Bulldogs and Gold Coast Titans.

See also
 List of schools in Queensland

References

External links
 Marsden State High School website

Public high schools in Queensland
Schools in Logan City
Educational institutions established in 1987
1987 establishments in Australia